The 857th Bombardment Squadron is one of the two predecessors of the 557th Tactical Air Support Squadron, an inactive United States Air Force unit, formed in 1985 by the consolidation of the 857th with another inactive bombardment squadron.  It has never been active under its most recent designation.

The 857th was a United States Army Air Forces unit.  it was first activated in October 1943 as one of the original Consolidated B-24 Liberator squadrons of the 492d Bombardment Group.  After deploying to England, the 492d entered the strategic bombing campaign against Germany, but in three months of combat, the 492d Group suffered the most severe losses of an Eighth Air Force bomber group.  The 492d Group was withdrawn from combat in August 1944, and the 857th moved on paper to replace the 850th Bombardment Squadron, which was engaged in Operation Carpetbagger, dropping agents and supplies behind German lines, primarily in France.  As American forces advanced in France, this special operations mission diminished.  The squadron transported fuel to mechanized units in France, then participated in night bombing.  It was inactivated in October 1945.

The other predecessor of the squadron was the 657th Bombardment Squadron, a Strategic Air Command unit that flew Boeing B-47 Stratojets from 1958 until 1962.

History

World War II

Training and strategic bombing
The squadron was first organized in October 1943 at Alamogordo Army Air Field, New Mexico, as one of the original squadrons of the 492d Bombardment Group. Its cadre was drawn from the 859th Bombardment Squadron, a former antisubmarine unit whose mission had transferred to the Navy. By January 1944, most of the ground echelon of the squadron had been used to form other bomber units.  2d Bombardment Division, which controlled VIII Bomber Command's Liberator units in England, began to form a new ground echelon for the squadron from personnel of bomber units already in England, while the air echelon of the 857th continued training with Consolidated B-24 Liberators at Alamogordo.

On 14 April, the ground echelon that had been formed in England arrived at RAF North Pickenham  The air echelon began arriving on 18 April.  The squadron flew its first combat mission on 11 May 1944, joining the strategic bombing campaign with attacks primarily on targets in central Germany.  During the first week in June, the squadron was diverted from strategic targets to support Operation Overlord by attacking airfields and V-1 flying bomb and V-2 rocket launch sites. It bombed coastal defenses in Normandy on D-Day, 6 June 1944, and continued interdiction attacks until the middle of the month.

Except for support of Operation Cobra, the breakout at Saint Lo, the squadron then resumed bombardment of strategic targets in Germany.  However, during its three months of strategic operations the 492d Group suffered the heaviest losses of any Eighth Air Force group.  On 5 August, the decision was made to withdraw the 492d Group from combat.  The group's heavy losses had begun with one of the group's earliest missions, an attack on Braunschweig, in which it lost eight Liberators to enemy interceptors.  When the 492d Group returned to strategic operation, on 20 June Luftwaffe fighters, primarily Messerschmitt Bf 110s, using air to air rockets shot down fourteen of the 492d Group's B-24s.  Heavy losses, this time to fighters from Jagdgeschwader 3, were again suffered on 29 June.

Special operations

The 857th Squadron moved to RAF Harrington in August, where it assumed the Operation Carpetbagger missions and most of the personnel and equipment of the 850th Bombardment Squadron.  With the 492d Group, the squadron flew 185 Operation Carpetbagger missions by the middle of September.  With black-painted aircraft configured with engine flame dampeners and optimized for night operations, the group operated chiefly over France with B-24s and C-47s, transporting agents, supplies, and propaganda leaflets to patriots.  As Allied forces moved forward through northern France and into Belgium, the need for Carpetbagger missions decreased and operations ended on 16 September 1944.  The squadron's support for the French Resistance earned it the French Croix de Guerre with Palm.  With the drawdown of the Carpetbagger mission, the squadron concentrated on hauling gasoline to advancing mechanized forces in France and Belgium.  After December 1944, the squadron began limited night bombing operations.

In March 1945, the squadron's crews and planes were assigned to other units, while it moved on paper to RAF Bassingbourn, where it took over the fighters of the former 1st Scouting Force and came under the control of the 1st Air Division.  The scouting force had been organized in July 1944 to precede bomber formations attacking Europe and provide them with information to avoid weather, and in some cases, enemy interceptors.  The squadron continued this mission until the end of hostilities.  The squadron left England for the United States in early August 1945. In August 1945 it began to reform at Kirtland Field, New Mexico as a Boeing B-29 Superfortress very heavy bomber squadron, however it became unnecessary when the Pacific War ended and it was inactivated on 17 October 1945.

Strategic Air Command

Starting in 1958, the Boeing B-47 Stratojet wings of Strategic Air Command (SAC) began to assume an alert posture at their home bases, reducing the amount of time spent on alert at overseas bases.  The SAC alert cycle divided itself into four parts: planning, flying, alert and rest to meet General Thomas S. Power’s initial goal of maintaining one third of SAC’s planes on fifteen minute ground alert, fully fueled and ready for combat to reduce vulnerability to a Soviet missile strike.  To implement this new system, B-47 wings reorganized from three to four squadrons.  The 657th Bombardment Squadron was activated at Lake Charles Air Force Base as the fourth squadron of the 68th Bombardment Wing.  The SAC alert commitment was increased to half the wing's aircraft in 1962 and the four squadron pattern no longer met the alert cycle commitment, so the squadron became non-operational on 1 October 1961 and was inactivated on 1 January 1962.

In September 1985, the 857th Bombardment Squadron and the 657th Bombardment Squadron were consolidated as the 557th Tactical Air Support Squadron, but the consolidated squadron has never been active.

Lineage
 857th Bombardment Squadron
 Constituted as the 857th Bombardment Squadron, Heavy on 14 September 1943
 Activated on 1 October 1943
 Redesignated as: 857th Bombardment Squadron, Very Heavy on 5 August 1945
 Inactivated on 17 October 1945
 Consolidated with the 657th Bombardment Squadron as the 557th Tactical Air Support Squadron on 15 September 1985

 657th Bombardment Squadron
 Constituted as the 657th Bombardment Squadron, Medium on 20 August 1958
 Activated on 1 December 1958
 Inactivated on 1 January 1962
 Consolidated with the 857th Bombardment Squadron as the 557th Tactical Air Support Squadron on 15 September 1985

Assignments
 492d Bombardment Group, 1 October 1943 – 17 October 1945 (attached to 1st Air Division, 10 March-14 August 1945)
 68th Bombardment Wing, 1 December 1958 – 1 January 1962 (not operational after 1 October 1961)

Stations
 Alamogordo Army Air Field, New Mexico, 1 October 1943
 RAF North Pickenham (Station 143), England, 1 January 1944
 RAF Harrington (Station 179), England, 10 August 1944
 RAF Bassingbourn (Station 121), England, 10 March 1945
 RAF Alconbury (Station 102), England, 11 June–6 August 1944
 Sioux Falls Army Air Field, South Dakota, 14 August 1945
 Kirtland Field, New Mexico, 17 August–17 October 1945
 Lake Charles Air Force Base (later Chennault Air Force Base), Louisiana, 1 December 1958 – 1 January 1962

Aircraft
 Consolidated B-24 Liberator, 1943–1945
 Douglas C-47 Skytrain, 1944–1945
 North American P-51 Mustang, 1945
 Douglas A-26 Invader, 1945
 Boeing B-17 Flying Fortress, 1945
 Boeing B-47 Stratojet, 1958–1962

Awards and campaigns

References

Notes
 Explanatory notes

 Citations

Bibliography

 
 
 
 
 
 
 

 Further reading
 

Strategic bombing squadrons of the United States Army Air Forces
Military units and formations established in 1943
1943 establishments in the United States